Psyllotoxus inexpectatus is a species of beetle in the family Cerambycidae. It was described by Martins and Galileo in 1990. It is known from Brazil.

References

Onciderini
Beetles described in 1990